Herbie Lovelle (June 1 1924 - April 8, 2009) was an American drummer, who played jazz, R&B, rock, and folk. He was also a studio musician and an actor.

Lovelle's uncle was the drummer Arthur Herbert. Lovelle began his career with the trumpeter, singer and band leader Hot Lips Page in the late 1940s, then played in the 1950s with the saxophonist Hal Singer, Johnny Moore's Three Blazers and the pianist Earl Hines. Through working for Lucky Thompson and Jimmy Rushing of Count Basie's Orchestra, he became house drummer at the Savoy Ballroom in New York City for much of the 1950s. He toured with the tenor saxophonist Arnett Cobb and the pianist Teddy Wilson in 1954. In 1959 he contributed to the pianist Paul Curry's album Paul Curry Presents the Friends of Fats, released on the Golden Crest label.

In the early years of television, he performed with the King Guion Orchestra on the Jerry Lester Show and the Ed Sullivan Show. In 1966, he was the lead drummer for the Sammy Davis, Jr. TV show.

Lovelle began playing more R&B in the 1950s and worked as a studio musician, often with Sam Taylor. He played on albums by Bob Dylan (The Freewheelin' Bob Dylan), Pearls Before Swine, Eric Andersen, David Blue, John Denver, Tom Rush, B. B. King, John Martyn (Stormbringer!), the Strangeloves, the McCoys, and the Monkees. He continued working as a studio musician well into the 1980s.

In 1976, he produced the first album by Stuff, which went platinum in Japan. He also played the drums in the 1976 revival of Guys and Dolls.

From1980 he acted in film and television, including Law & Order (1995–2004). His film credits include Bella (2006), Mitchellville (2004) (Sundance), The Rhythm of the Saints (2003), Don't Explain (2002), The Curse of the Jade Scorpion (2001), Down to Earth (2001),  Girlfight (2000), Maximum Risk (1996), Getting Away with Murder (1996), White Lies (1996), Bleeding Hearts (1994), The Paper (1994), Running on Empty (1988), Death Wish III (1985), A Man Called Adam (1966).

His TV credits include Into the Fire (2005), How Do You Spell Belief? (2005), Kingpin Rising (2005), Third Watch (2 episodes, 2005), and Law & Order TV (1995–2004).

Discography

With Eric Andersen
 'Bout Changes 'n' Things Take 2 (Vanguard, 1967)
 Avalanche (Warner Bros., 1968)
 More Hits from Tin Can Alley (Vanguard, 1968)

With Solomon Burke
 I Wish I Knew (Atlantic, 1968)
 King Solomon (Atlantic, 1968)

With Cándido Camero
 Thousand Finger Man (Solid State, 1970)
 Beautiful (Blue Note, 1971)

With Buck Clayton
 Jazz Gallery (Philips, 1959)
 Songs for Swingers (Columbia, 1959)
 Copenhagen Concert (SteepleChase, 1979)

With John Denver
 Rhymes & Reasons (RCA Records, 1969)
 Take Me to Tomorrow (RCA Victor, 1970)
 Farewell Andromeda (RCA Victor, 1973)
 Rocky Mountain Christmas (RCA Records, 1975)

With Art Farmer
 Art Farmer Plays (Prestige, 1955)
 Early Art (New Jazz, 1961)
 Farmer's Market (Prestige, 1973)

With Lightning Hopkins
 Goin' Away (Prestige, 1963)
 Soul Blues (Prestige, 1965)
 Down Home Blues (Prestige, 1965)

With B.B. King
 Completely Well (Bluesway, 1969)
 Indianola Mississippi Seeds (ABC, 1970)

With Herbie Mann
 The Herbie Mann String Album (Atlantic, 1967)
 Glory of Love (CTI, 1967)

With Sonny Stitt
 Soul Shack (Prestige, 1963)
 Primitivo Soul (Prestige, 1964)

With Rufus Thomas
 Crown the Prince of Dance (Stax, 1973)

With others
 Nat Adderley, Sayin' Somethin''' (Atlantic, 1966)
 Tony Bennett, My Heart Sings (Columbia, 1961)
 Emmett Berry, Beauty and The Blues (Columbia, 1960)
 David Blue, David Blue (Elektra, 1966)
 Terence Boylan, Alias Boona (Verve Forecast, 1969)
 Ruth Brown, Black Is Brown and Brown Is Beautiful (Skye, 1969)
 Rusty Bryant, Rusty Bryant Returns (Prestige, 1969)
 Fats Domino, Fats Is Back (Reprise, 1968)
 Bob Dylan, The Freewheelin' Bob Dylan (Columbia, 1963)
 Dave Frishberg, Oklahoma Toad (CTI, 1970)
 Slim Gaillard, Mish Mash (Mercury, 1953)
 Erroll Garner, That's My Kick (MGM, 1967)
 Leonard Gaskin, At the Jazz Band Ball (Swingville, 1962)
 Lotti Golden, Motor-Cycle (Atlantic, 1969)
 Johnny Hodges, Blue Pyramid (Verve, 1966)
 Red Holloway, The Burner (Prestige, 1964)
 Richard "Groove" Holmes, That Healin' Feelin' (Prestige, 1968)
 Illinois Jacquet, Spectrum (Argo, 1965)
 Eddie Jefferson, Joe Carroll, Annie Ross, The Bebop Singers (Prestige, 1970)
 Big Joe Turner, Singing the Blues (BluesWay, 1967)
 Budd Johnson, Budd Johnson and the Four Brass Giants (Riverside, 1960)
 Gordon Lightfoot, Did She Mention My Name? (United Artists, 1968)
 Wade Marcus, A New Era (Cotillion, 1971)
 John Martyn and Beverley Martyn, Stormbringer! (Island, 1970)
 Percy Mayfield, Blues and Then Some (RCA Victor, 1971)
 The Monkees, Listen to the Band (Rhino, 1991)
 Melba Moore, This Is It (Buddah, 1976)
 Van Morrison, T.B. Sheets (Bang, 1973)
 Chico O'Farrill, Married Well (Verve, 1967)
 Chuck Rainey, The Chuck Rainey Coalition (Skye, 1972)
 Tom Rapp, Beautiful Lies You Could Live In (Reprise, 1971)
 Tom Rush, The Circle Game (Elektra, 1968)
 Tom Rush, Tom Rush (Columbia, 1970)
 Evie Sands, Any Way That You Want Me (Rev-Ola, 1970)
 Marlena Shaw, From the Depths of My Soul (Blue Note, 1973)
 Ian & Sylvia, Ian & Sylvia (Columbia, 1971)
 Buddy Tate, Swinging Like Tate (Felsted, 1958)
 Leon Thomas, Full Circle (Flying Dutchman, 1973)
 Muddy Waters, The London Muddy Waters Sessions (Chess, 1972)
 Dicky Wells, Trombone Four-in-Hand (Felsted, 1959)
 Ernie Wilkins, Screaming Mothers (Mainstream, 1974)
 Jimmy Witherspoon, Blues Around the Clock'' (Prestige, 1964)

External links
Eugene Chadbourne, [ Herb Lovelle] at Allmusic

Discogs, Herb Lovelle
Artistdirect, Herb Lovelle
Stuff, the Band, Video: Gil Markle talks with Herb Lovelle, about the milestone Stuff recording.
Paula Lockheart "The Formative Years of Herb Lovell" (1997) 

1924 births
2009 deaths
American jazz drummers
American session musicians
Musicians from New York City
African-American drummers
American rock drummers
African-American male actors
American male television actors
American male film actors
20th-century American drummers
American male drummers
Jazz musicians from New York (state)
20th-century American male actors
20th-century American male musicians
American male jazz musicians
20th-century African-American musicians
21st-century African-American people